Daron K. Roberts (born November 29, 1978, in Mt. Pleasant, Texas) is a university lecturer and former football coach. He is the founding director of the Center for Sports Leadership & Innovation at the University of Texas, where he also serves as a lecturer in the Plan II Honors program, teaching courses on sports leadership and innovation. His writing has appeared in The Houston Chronicle and Huffington Post as well as Forbes and Fortune. He has served as a guest analyst for ESPN's Longhorn Network.

Early years

Daron Roberts was born in Longview, Texas, on November 29, 1978. He is a fifth-generation East Texan. His family moved to Mount Pleasant, Texas, when Roberts was 5, and he attended Mount Pleasant Independent School District public schools before graduating from Mount Pleasant High School in 1997.  As a member of the varsity football team, Roberts earned 1st Team All-District Honors as a strong safety in 1996. During high school, Roberts served as class president all four years.

College years

Roberts attended the University of Texas and double majored in the Plan II Honors Program and Government while being an active member of the Texas Cowboys. During his senior year, Roberts won the student government presidency of the largest student body in the United States. After graduating in 2001, Roberts deferred entrance to the Harvard Kennedy School of Government at Harvard University and worked as an intern for Senator Joseph I. Lieberman and Lt. Governor Bill Ratliff before attending the Harvard Kennedy School beginning in the fall of in 2004

After graduating with a master's degree in public policy, Roberts entered Harvard Law School. During the summer before his third year, Roberts volunteered at the Steve Spurrier Football Camp at the University of South Carolina. That experience prompted Roberts to pursue a football coaching job. He returned to Harvard and wrote 164 letters seeking an internship. After writing letters to the head coach and defensive coordinator of every NFL franchise and 50 FBS teams, Roberts received an offer to serve as a training camp intern with the Kansas City Chiefs.

Coaching career

Impressed by his enthusiasm and people skills, Chiefs coach Herman Edwards allowed Roberts to volunteer for the 2007 season before hiring him as a defensive quality control assistant in 2008. He assisted the defensive backs coach with off-the-field matters while in Kansas City. 

In 2009, Roberts left the Chiefs to work as the assistant secondary coach with the Detroit Lions. 

In 2011, Roberts left his position with the Detroit Lions to become the special teams and inside receivers coach at West Virginia University. For the 2012 season, Roberts was the Mountaineers' cornerbacks coach.

The following year he made the jump back to the NFL and was the assistant secondary coach for the Cleveland Browns.

4th and 1

In 2010, Roberts founded 4th and 1, a nonprofit that provides free ACT prep, football skills training, and life skills development to high school students in Texas and Michigan. The first 4th and 1 Football Camp was offered at Northeast Texas Community College in Mount Pleasant, Texas. A select group of 35 student-athletes were chosen from four East Texas counties. Former Longhorn stars Derrick Johnson and Ahmad Brooks visited the camp. 4th and 1 held camps at Michigan State (East Lansing) and Mount Pleasant, Texas, in 2011 and 2012. 

For his efforts. the University of Texas awarded him the 2011 Outstanding Young Texas "Ex."

References

1978 births
Living people
People from Longview, Texas
West Virginia Mountaineers football coaches
Harvard Kennedy School alumni
Harvard Law School alumni
University of Texas alumni
West Virginia University people
Detroit Lions coaches
Kansas City Chiefs personnel